Canção do Amor Demais is 1958 album by Elizete Cardoso. It is often considered the first bossa nova album, and contains the first recordings of João Gilberto's guitar beat, which would go on to become a staple of bossa nova. Gilberto played guitar on "Chega de Saudade" and "Outra Vez".

The music was composed by Vinícius de Moraes and Tom Jobim. Despite its historical importance, and although it was noticed by prominent people in the recording industry, the album's commercial impact was limited. It was released on the small Festa label, which had previously primarily made recordings featuring spoken poetry, and only two thousand copies were initially pressed. Cardoso, already recognized as one of Brazil's best-ever singers, was never identified as a bossa singer, although she would be featured on the legendary Black Orpheus soundtrack, another bossa landmark.

The album was listed by Rolling Stone Brazil as one of the 100 best Brazilian albums in history.

Track listing
Chega de Saudade
Serenata do Adeus
As Praias Desertas
Caminho de Pedra
Luciana
Janelas Abertas
Eu Não Existo Sem Você
Outra Vez
Medo de Amar
Estrada Branca
Vida Bela
Modinha
Canção do Amor Demais

Tracks #2 and #9 by Vinicius de Moraes, #3 and #8 by Tom Jobim. All other tracks by Tom Jobim/Vinicius de Moraes.

Performer credits
Elizete Cardoso - vocal
Antonio Carlos Jobim - arrangements, direction, and piano
João Gilberto - guitar
Irany Pinto - violin and conductor
Nicolino Copia (Copinha) - flute
Gaúcho & Maciel - trombones
Herbert - trumpet
Vidal - bass
Juquinha - drums
Seven violins, two violas, and two cellos, unidentified
J. Gilberto, A.C. Jobim, and Walter Santos - chorus on "Chega de Saudade"

References

1958 albums
Elizete Cardoso albums
Portuguese-language albums